The 1930 Canadian federal election was held on July 28, 1930, to elect members  of the House of Commons of the 17th Parliament of Canada. Richard Bedford Bennett's Conservative Party won a majority government, defeating the Liberal Party led by Prime Minister William Lyon Mackenzie King.

Background 
The first signs of the Great Depression were clearly evident by the 1930 election, and Conservative party leader Richard Bennett campaigned on a platform of aggressive measures in order to combat it.

Part of the reason for Bennett's success lay in the Liberals' own handling of the rising unemployment of 1930. Touting the Liberal formula as the reason for the economic prosperity of the 1920s, for example, left the Liberals carrying much of the responsibility, whether deserved or not, for the consequences of the crash of the American stock market.

King was apparently oblivious to the rising unemployment that greeted the 1930s, and continued to laud his government's hand in Canada's prosperity.  Demands for aid were met with accusations of being the part of a great "Tory conspiracy," which led King to make his famous "five-cent piece" outburst, alienating a growing number of voters. In retrospect, one can understand King's reasoning.  Both the Western mayors and provincial Premiers who had visited King with requests of relief were overwhelmingly Conservative: in the Premiers' case, seven out of nine.  King concluded in Parliamentary debates that though aid was a provincial jurisdiction, the fact that he believed there to be no unemployment problem meant that the requests from the provinces appeared to be nothing more than political grandstanding. The Federal Conservatives had certainly exaggerated the Depression in its early stages solely to attack King's government.

Several other factors entered into King's defeat. Although obtaining funds from sometimes dubious sources was not a problem, the Liberal election machine was not as efficient as it once was, primarily due to the cause of the age and poor health of many chief strategists.  King's campaign was the epitome of Murphy's law: every campaign stop appeared to meet the Prime Minister with some kind of mishap.

By contrast, Bennett's Conservatives were electric. The self-made man who led them had practically rebuilt his party (a significant part of it with his own funds) and developed an election machine which could rival the Liberals'. Aside from superior party organization, the Tories used it. They bought out newspapers in key areas (notably the Liberal strongholds of the West, and Quebec) and ensured that pro-Tory slants were kept. In the first election where radio played an important role, Bennett's vibrant, zealous voice was extremely preferable to King's. (The Tory machine, of course, ensured that only the best radio spots were available to Bennett.)

Also, Bennett's tariff policy, epitomized by his infamous promise to "blast" Canada's way into world markets, was extremely well received in the key Liberal strongholds of the West and Quebec.  In the West, agricultural production had been hurt by worldwide overproduction, and certain agricultural groups in Quebec firmly endorsed Bennett's tariff policy. Bennett's Conservatives won much of the former Progressive and Farmers' vote in the West, and they were elected with 44% of the popular vote in Quebec as a protest vote.

All those factors led to Bennett's eventual election.

Canadian voters agreed with Bennett and the Conservatives were elected with a majority of 137 seats in the House Of Commons. The incumbent Liberals under William Lyon Mackenzie King became the official opposition after being reduced to 89.

The Progressives continued their decline, winning only three seats. The United Farmers of Alberta did somewhat better - despite finishing third place in the popular vote in that province they managed to hold on to nine of its seventeen seats (of which the UFA only contested ten). This would be the last federal election the Progressives or the UFA would win any seats.

Unfortunately for Bennett and the Conservatives, the Depression brought complex problems to politicians and extreme hardship for most Canadians. Bennett and the Conservatives lost the 1935 election to the Liberals under the previous Prime Minister William Lyon Mackenzie King, and would not return to government until 1957.

National results 

Note:

* The party did not nominate candidates in the previous election.

Vote and seat summaries

Results by province 

 xx - less than 0.05% of the popular vote

See also

17th Canadian Parliament
List of Canadian federal general elections
List of political parties in Canada

References

Further reading
 

 Federal
1930
July 1930 events